This is a list of events from British radio in 1929.

Events
6 November – Week in Westminster debuts on the BBC Home Service; it will still be running more than 90 years later.
Tatsfield Receiving Station – formally the BBC Engineering Measurement and Receiving Station – begins operation on the North Downs in Surrey.
Welsh language radio begins to be broadcast from the BBC's Daventry transmitter.

Births
27 April – Derek Chinnery (died 2015), British radio controller.
25 September – Ronnie Barker (died 2015), English comic actor.
25 November – Tim Gudgin (died 2017), English sports results announcer.
29 November – Derek Jameson (died 2012), English newspaper editor and broadcaster.
28 December – Brian Redhead (died 1994), English radio news presenter.

References 

 
Years in British radio
Radio